
Gmina Niepołomice is an urban-rural gmina (administrative district) in Wieliczka County, Lesser Poland Voivodeship, in southern Poland.

Villages
Apart from the town of Niepołomice, Gmina Niepołomice contains the villages and settlements of Chobot, Ochmanów, Podłęże, Słomiróg, Staniątki, Suchoraba, Wola Batorska, Wola Zabierzowska, Zagórze, Zakrzów and Zakrzowiec.

Neighbouring gminas
Gmina Niepołomice is bordered by the city of Kraków and by the gminas of Biskupice, Drwinia, Gdów, Igołomia-Wawrzeńczyce, Kłaj and Wieliczka.

References
Polish official population figures 2006

Niepolomice
Wieliczka County